French Alexis Tickner (August 26, 1930 – August 26, 2021) was an American–born Canadian voice, film and television actor, known for his work in Ocean Productions.

Filmography

Anime/Animation

 Death Note - Quillish “Watari” Wammy
 Black Lagoon - Alfred
 Pucca - Santa
 Powerpuff Girls Z - Santa
 Hikaru no Go - Honinbo Kuwabara
 Transformers: Energon - Bulkhead
 Fantastic Four: World's Greatest Heroes - Grandmaster
 A Monkey's Tale - Korkonak
 Being Ian - Willy Willychuk, Snowy
 Class of the Titans - Poseidon
 Master Keaton - Klause, Greenpark, Libero
 Mega Man NT Warrior - Mayor Daryl
 Inuyasha - Kagome's Grandpa
 Krypto the Superdog - Kevin's Grandpa
 Firehouse Tales - Wiser 
 Martha Speaks - Alfred Abbott
 He-Man and the Masters of the Universe - Sortech
 Mobile Suit Gundam - Dozle Zabi
 Dragon Ball Z - King Moai, Mr. Popo (Ocean Group dub)
 Penny Crayon - The Headmaster, Additional Voices
 Nellie the Elephant - Narrator (US Dub)
 Madeline - Lord Cucuface
 Barbie in the Nutcracker - Grandfather Drosselmayer
 Fatal Fury 2: The New Battle - Jubei Yamada
 Rainbow Fish - Principal Gefilte, Lobster Bisque, Crab Cakes
 Hulk Vs. - Odin
 Bionicle 3: Web of Shadows - Norik
 Sabrina, the Animated Series - Additional Voices
 Monster Mash Ben Hur - Gaspar, Jewish Man, Doctor
 Robin and the Dreamweavers - Dr. Reedenhauer
 Jin-Roh: The Wolf Brigade - Isao Aniya
 Ranma ½ - Shinnosuke's Grandfather
 Gadget and the Gadgetinis - Additional Voices
 Salty's Lighthouse - Top Hat, Warrior, Grampus, Steamer, Scuttle Butt Pete
 Adventures of Sonic the Hedgehog - Professor von Schlemmer
 Dragon Tales - Gamboli, Chilly the Snowman
 Capertown Cops Pocket Dragon Adventures - Additional Voices
 Mummies Alive! - Additional Voices
 Fat Dog Mendoza - Old Grandpappy Buddy
 Iron Man: Armored Adventures - Professor Zimmer
 In Search of Santa - Santa Claus
 X-Men: Evolution - Professor
 Monster Rancher - Wondar Brother #2
 The Christmas Orange - Santa
 RoboCop: Alpha Commando - Additional Voices
 Action Man - Additional Voices
 Hurricanes - Additional Voices
 A Tale of Two Kitties - Grandpa
 Ricky Sprocket: Showbiz Boy Timothy Tweedle the First Christmas Elf - Nicholas
 The Little Prince - The Great Timekeeper
 Superbook - Isaac
 Beat Bugs - Christmas Beetle

Live-actionPsych - Carl (S2, E10)
 Ernest Goes to School - Principal Procter
 The Death of the Incredible Hulk - George Tilmer 
 The X-Files - Preacher
 Smallville - Jewelry Store Owner/Simon Westcott

Video gamesMobile Suit Gundam: Encounters in Space - Dozle ZabiDynasty Warriors Gundam 2 - Dozle ZabiDynasty Warriors Gundam 3'' - Dozle Zabi

References

External links

1930 births
2021 deaths
American emigrants to Canada
Canadian male television actors
Canadian male video game actors
Canadian male voice actors
Male actors from Illinois
Male actors from Vancouver
People from Olney, Illinois
20th-century American male actors
21st-century American male actors
20th-century Canadian male actors
21st-century Canadian male actors